This is a List of leaders of dependent territories in 2014

Argentina

  (claimed territory)
 Administered by the Governor of Tierra del Fuego, Antarctica, and the Islands of the South Atlantic Province of Argentina
 Argentinian Antarctic claim has not been recognized by the United Nations, US, Russia, or by most other countries.
See also: Antarctic Treaty.

Australia

  Ashmore and Cartier Islands (uninhabited territory)
 Administered by Australian Ministry of Infrastructure and Regional Development
  Australian Antarctic Territory (territory)
 Administered by the Australian Antarctic Division of the Ministry of Environment
 Australian Antarctic claim has not been recognized by the United Nations, US, Russia, or by most other countries.
See also: Antarctic Treaty.
  (territory)
 Administrator
Jon Stanhope, Administrator of Christmas Island (2012–2014)
Barry Haase, Administrator of Christmas Island (2014–2017) 
President of Shire – Gordon Thomson, President of the Christmas Island Shire Council (2013–present)
  (territory)
 Administrator
Jon Stanhope, Administrator of Christmas Island (2012–2014)
Barry Haase, Administrator of Christmas Island (2014–2017) 
 President of the Shire – Aindil Minkom, President of the Shire Council of Cocos Island (2011–2015)
  Coral Sea Islands (uninhabited territory)
 Administered by the Australian Ministry of Infrastructure and Regional Development
  Heard Island and McDonald Islands (uninhabited territory)
 Administered by the Australian Antarctic Division of the Ministry of Environment
  (unincorporated, self-governed, area of New South Wales)
 Chairman of the Lord Howe Island Board
Chris Eccles, Chairman of the Lord Howe Island Board (2013–2014)
Barney Nichols, Acting Chairman of the Lord Howe Island Board (2014–2015) 
  Macquarie Island (uninhabited territory of Tasmania)
 Administered by the Park and Wildlife Service of Tasmanian Ministry for Environment, Parks and Heritage
  (territory)
 Administrator –
 Neil Pope, Administrator of Norfolk Island (2012–2014)
 Gary Hardgrave, Administrator of Norfolk Island (2014–2017) 
 Chief Minister – Lisle Snell, Chief Minister of Norfolk Island (2013–2015)
 Torres Strait Islands (territory with a special status fitting the native land rights)
 Chairperson of the Torres Strait Regional Authority – Joseph Elu, Chairperson of the Torres Strait Regional Authority (2012–2016)

Brazil

  Brazilian Antarctica (claimed territory)
 Chairman of Brazilian National Commission on Antarctic Matters (Minister of External Relations of Brazil)
Luiz Alberto Figueiredo Chairman of Brazilian National Commission on Antarctic Matters (2013–2014)
Mauro Vieira Chairman of Brazilian National Commission on Antarctic Matters (2014–2016)
 Brazilian Antarctic claim has not been recognized by the United Nations, US, Russia, or by most other countries.
See also: Antarctic Treaty.

Chile

  (claimed territory)
 Governor of Antártica Chilena Province
 Nelson Cárcamo Barrera, Governor of Antártica Chilena Province (2010–2014)
 Patricio Oyarzo Gaez, Governor of Antártica Chilena Province (2014–2016) 
 Chilean Antarctic claim has not been recognized by the United Nations, US, Russia, or by most other countries.
See also: Antarctic Treaty.
  (territory)
 Governor of Easter Island Province
Carmen Cardinali Paoa, Governor of Easter Island Province (2010–2014)
Marta Hotus Tuki, Governor of Easter Island Province (2014–2015) 
 Mayor – Pero Edmunds Paoa, Mayor of Easter Island (2012–present)

People's Republic of China (PRC)

   (special administrative region)
 Chief Executive – Leung Chun-ying, Chief Executive of Hong Kong (2012–20117)
  (special administrative region)
 Chief Executive – Fernando Chui, Chief Executive of Macao (2009–2019)

Denmark

  (autonomous territory)
 High Commissioner – Dan Michael Knudsen, High Commissioner of the Faroe Islands (2008–present)
 Prime Minister – Kaj Leo Johannesen, Prime Minister of the Faroe Islands (2008–2015)
  (autonomous territory)
 High Commissioner – Mikaela Engell, High Commissioner of Greenland (2011–present)
 Prime Minister
Aleqa Hammond, Prime Minister of Greenland (2013–2014)
Kim Kielsen, Prime Minister of Greenland (2014–2021) 

Ecuador
  (province)
 Governor – Jorge Alfredo Torres Pallo, Governor of Galapagos Island (2008–2015)
 Chairman of the Governing Council with Special Regime – María Isabel Salvador, Chairman of the Governing Council with Special Regime of Galapagos Island (2013–2015)

Finland
  (autonomous region)
 Governor – Peter Lindbäck, Governor of Åland Islands (1999–present)
 Premier – Camilla Gunell, Premier of Åland Islands (2011–2015)

France

  Bassas da India (uninhabited territory)
 Administered by the administrator of French Southern and Antarctic Lands
  Clipperton Island (uninhabited territory)
 Administered by French minister of Overseas France through the high commissioner of the Republic in French Polynesia
  Europa Island (uninhabited territory)
 Administered by the administrator of French Southern and Antarctic Lands
  (Guyane) (overseas  and region)
 Prefect – Éric Spitz, Prefect of French Guiana (2013–2016)
 President of the Regional Council – Alain Tien-Liong, President of the Regional Council of Guyane (2011–2015)
 President of the General Council – Rodolphe Alexandre, President of the General Council of Guyane (2010–2015)
  (overseas country)
 High Commissioner – Lionel Beffre, High Commissioner of French Polynesia (2013–2016)
 President
Gaston Flosse, President of French Polynesia (2013–2014)
Nuihau Laurey, Acting president of French Polynesia (2014) 
Édouard Fritch, President of French Polynesia (2014–present) 
  (overseas territory)
 Administrator-Superior
Pascal Bolot, Administrator-Superior of French Southern and Antarctic Lands (2012–2014)
Cécile Pozzo di Borgo, Administrator-Superior of French Southern and Antarctic Lands (2014–2018) 
 French Antarctic claim (Adélie Land) has not been recognised by the United Nations, US, Russia, or by most other countries.
See also: Antarctic Treaty.
  Glorioso Islands (uninhabited territory)
 Administered by the administrator of French Southern and Antarctic Lands
  (overseas  and region)
 Prefect –
 Marcelle Pierrot, Prefect of Guadeloupe (2013–2014)
 Jacques Billant, Prefect of Guadeloupe (2014–2017) 
 President of the Regional Council
Josette Borel-Lincertin, President of the Regional Council of Guadeloupe (2012–2014)
Victorin Lurel, President of the Regional Council of Guadeloupe (2014–2015) 
 President of the General Council – Jacques Gillot, President of the General Council of Guadeloupe (2001–2015)
 Juan de Nova''' (uninhabited territory) Administered by the administrator of French Southern and Antarctic Lands   (overseas  and region)
 Prefect
Laurent Prévost, Prefect of Martinique (2011–2014)
Fabrice Rigoulet-Roze, Prefect of Martinique (2014–2017) 
 President of the Regional Council – Serge Letchimy, President of the Regional Council of Martinique (2010–2015)
 President of the General Council – Josette Manin, President of the General Council of Martinique (2011–2015)
  (overseas  and region)
 Prefect
Jacques Witkowski, Prefect of Mayotte (2013–2014)
Seymour Morsy, Prefect of Mayotte (2014–2016)  
 President of the General Council – Daniel Zaïdani, President of the General Council of Mayotte (2011–2015)
  (overseas country)
 High Commissioner
Jean-Jacques Brot, High Commissioner of New Caledonia (2013–2014)
Pascal Gauci, Acting High Commissioner of New Caledonia (2014) 
Vincent Bouvier, High Commissioner of New Caledonia (2014–2016) 
 President of the Government
Harold Martin, President of the Government of New Caledonia (2011–2014)
Cynthia Ligeard, President of the Government of New Caledonia (2014–2015) 
  Réunion (overseas  and region)
 Prefect
Jean-Luc Marx, Prefect of Réunion (2012–2014)
Dominique Sorain, Prefect of Réunion (2014 - 2017)  
 President of the Regional Council – Didier Robert, President of the Regional Council of Réunion (2010–2021)
 President of the General Council – Nassimah Dindar, President of the General Council of Réunion (2004– 2015) 
  (Territorial collectivity)
 Prefect – The prefect of Guadeloupe is also state representative in Saint-Barthélemy from 9 July 2007.
 Prefect delegated – Phillipe Chopin, Prefect delegated of Saint-Barthélemy and Saint-Martin (2011 – 2015)
 President of the Territorial Council – Bruno Magras, President of the Territoria Council of Saint-Barthélemy (2007–present)
  Saint-Martin (Territorial collectivity)
 Prefect – The prefect of Guadeloupe is also state representative in Saint-Martin from 9 July 2007.
 Prefect delegated – Phillipe Chopin, Prefect delegated of Saint-Barthélemy and Saint-Martin (2011 – 2015)
 President of the Territorial Council – Aline Hanson, President of the Territoria Council of Saint-Martin (2013–2017)
  (overseas collectivity)
 Prefect
Patrice Latron, Prefect of Saint-Pierre and Miquelon (2011–2014)
Jean-Christophe Bouvier, Prefect of Saint-Pierre and Miquelon (2014–2016) 
 President of the General Council – Stéphane Artano, President of the General Council of Saint-Pierre and Miquelon (2006–2017)
  Tromelin (uninhabited territory)
 Administered by the administrator of French Southern and Antarctic Lands
  (overseas collectivity)
 Administrator-Superior – Michel Aubouin, Administrator-Superior of Wallis and Futuna (2013–2015)
 President of the Territorial Assembly
Petelo Hanisi, President of the Territorial Assembly of Wallis and Futuna (2013–2014)
Mikaele Kulimoetoke, President of the Territorial Assembly of Wallis and Futuna (2014–2017) 
  Alo  (Chiefdom of Wallis and Futuna) 
 King - Petelo Sea, King of Alofi (2014–2016) 
   Sigave  (Chiefdom of Wallis and Futuna) 
 King - Polikalepo Kolivai, King of Sigave (2010–2014) 
  Wallis  (chiefdom of Wallis and Futuna)) 
 King - Kapiliele Faupala, King of Wallis (2008–2014) 

Netherlands

  (autonomous territory)
 Governor – Fredis Refunjol, Governor of Aruba (2004–2016)
 Prime Minister – Mike Eman, Prime Minister of Aruba (2009–2017)
  (special municipality)
 Lieutenant Governor
Lydia Emerencia, Lieutenant Governor of Bonaire (2012–2014)
Edison Rijna, Lieutenant Governor of Bonaire (2014–present) 
  (autonomous territory)
 Governor – Lucille George-Wout, Governor of Curaçao (2013–present)
 Prime Minister – Ivar Asjes, Prime Minister of Curaçao (2013–2015)
  (special municipality)
 Lieutenant Governor – Jonathan G. A. Johnson, Lieutenant Governor of Saba (2008–present)
  (special municipality)
 Lieutenant Governor – Gerald Berkel, Lieutenant Governor of Sint Eustatius (2010–2016)
   (autonomous territory)
 Governor – Eugene Holiday, Governor of Sint Maarten (2010–present)
 Prime Minister
Sarah Wescot-Williams, Prime Minister of Sint Maarten (2010–2014)
Marcel Gumbs, Prime Minister of Sint Maarten (2014–2015) ) 

New Zealand

  (self-governing territory)
 High Commissioner –
 Joanna Kempkers, High Commissioner of the Cook Islands (2013–2014)
 Aimee Jephson, Acting High Commissioner of the Cook Islands (2014–2015)   
 Queen's Representative – Tom Marsters, Queen's Representative of the Cook Islands (2013–present)
 Prime Minister – Henry Puna, Prime Minister of the Cook Islands (2010–2020)
  (associated state)
 High Commissioner
Mark Blumsky, High Commissioner of Niue (2011–2014)
Ross Ardern, High Commissioner of Niue (2014–2018) ) 
 Premier – Toke Talagi, Premier of Niue (2008–2020)
  Ross Dependency (New Zealand Antarctic Territory)  (territory)
 Administered by the New Zealand Antarctic Division
 New Zeelnand Antarctic claim has not been recognized by the United Nations, US, Russia, or by most other countries.
See also: Antarctic Treaty
  (territory)
 Administrator – Jonathan Kings, Administrator of Tokelau (2011–2015)
Head of Government
Salesio Lui, Head of Government of Tokelau (2013–2014)
Kuresa Nasau, Head of Government of Tokelau (2014–2015) 

Norway

  Bouvet Island (territory)
 Administered by the Polar Department of the Ministry of Justice and Public Security from Oslo
  Jan Mayen (territory)
 Administered by Governor of Nordland county of Norway
  Peter I Island (territory)
 Administered by the Polar Department of the Ministry of Justice and Public Security from Oslo
  Queen Maud Land (territory)
 Administered by the Polar Department of the Ministry of Justice and Public Security from Oslo
 Norwegian Antarctic claim has not been recognised by the United Nations, US, Russia, or by most other countries.
See also: Antarctic Treaty.
  Svalbard (territory)
 Governor – Odd Olsen Ingerø, Governor of Svalbard (2009–2015)

Portugal

  (autonomous region)
 Representative of the (Portuguese) Republic – Pedro Manuel dos Reis Alves Catarino, Representative of the Republic In Azores (2011–present)
 President of the Government – Vasco Cordeiro, President of the Government of the Azores (2012–2020)
  (autonomous region)
 Representative of the (Portuguese) Republic – Irineu Cabral Barreto, Representative of the Republic In Madeira (2011–present)
 President of the Government – Alberto João Jardim, President of the Government of the Madeira (1978–2015)

Spain

 Alborán Island (uninhabited territory)
 Administered by Ayuntamiento de Almería the Comarca of Almería of Spain
 Peñón de Alhucemas (uninhabited territory)
 Administered by Spanish Government
  (autonomous community)
 Government Delegate – María del Carmen Hernández Bento, Government Delegate in Canary Island (2011–2015)
 President – Paulino Rivero, President of the Canary Islands (2007–2015)
  (autonomous city)
 Government Delegate – Francisco Antonio González Pérez, Government Delegate in Ceuta (2011–2015)
 Mayor-President – Juan Jesús Vivas Lara, Mayor-President of Ceuta (2001–present)
 Chafarinas Islands (uninhabited territory)
 Administered by Spanish Government
  (autonomous city)
 Government Delegate – Abdelmalik El Barkani Abdelkader, Government Delegate in Melilla (2011–2018)
 Mayor-President – Juan José Imbroda, Mayor-President of Melilla (2000–2019)
 Peñón de Vélez de la Gomera (uninhabited territory)
 Administered by Spanish Government

South Africa

  Prince Edward Islands (uninhabited territory)
 Administered by Director of Southern Ocean and Antarctic Support of the South African ministry for Branch of Oceans and Coasts of the Department of Environmental Affairs

United Kingdom / British Crown

 Akrotiri and Dhekelia (overseas territory)
 Administrator – Richard J. Cripwell, Administrator of Akrotiri and Dhekelia (2013–2015)
  (overseas territory)
 Governor – Christina Scott, Governor of Anguilla (2013–2017)
 Chief Minister – Hubert Hughes, Chief Minister of Anguilla (2010–2015)
  (overseas territory)
 Governor – George Fergusson, Governor of Bermuda (2012–2016)
 Premier
Craig Cannonier, Premier of Bermuda (2012–2014)
Michael Dunkley, Premier of Bermuda (2014–2017) 
  (overseas territory)
 Commissioner – Peter Hayes, Commissioner of the British Antarctic Territory (2012–2016)
 Administrator – Henry Burgess, Administrator of the British Antarctic Territory (2011–2016)
 British Antarctic claim has not been recognized by the United Nations, US, Russia, or by most other countries.
See also: Antarctic Treaty.
  (Chagos Islands) (overseas territory)
 Commissioner – Peter Hayes, Commissioner of the British Indian Ocean Territory (2012–2016)
 Administrator – Tom Moody, Administrator of British Indian Ocean Territory (2013–2016)
  (overseas territory)
 Governor
William Boyd McCleary, Governor of the British Virgin Islands (2010–2014)
V. Inez Archibald, Acting Governor of the British Virgin Islands (2014) 
John Duncan, Governor of the British Virgin Islands (2014–2017) 
 Premier – Orlando Smith, Premier of the British Virgin Islands (2011–2019)
  (overseas territory)
 Governor – Helen Kilpatrick, Governor of the Cayman Islands (2013–2018)
 Premier – Alden McLaughlin, Premier of the Cayman Islands (2013–2021)
  (overseas territory)
 Governor
Nigel Haywood, Governor of the Falkland Islands (2010–2014)
Sandra Tyler-Haywood, Acting Governor of the Falkland Islands (2014) 
John Duncan, Acting Governor of the Falkland Islands (2014) 
Colin Roberts, Governor of the Falkland Islands (2014–2017) 
Chief Executive – Keith Padgett, Chief Executive of the Falkland Islands (2012–2016)
  (overseas territory)
 Governor – Sir James Dutton, Governor of Gibraltar (2013–2015)
 Chief Minister – Fabian Picardo, Chief Minister of Gibraltar (2011–present)
  (crown dependency)
 Monarch – Elizabeth II, Duke of Normandy (1952–present)
 Lieutenant-Governor – Peter Walker, Lieutenant-Governor of Guernsey (2011–2015)
 Bailiff – Richard Collas, Bailiff of Guernsey (2012–2020)
 Chief minister – 
 Peter Harwood, Chief Minister of Guernsey (2012–2014)
 Jonathan Le Tocq, Chief Minister of Guernsey (2014–2016)
  (self-governing island)
 Head of Government – Stuart Trought, President of the States of Alderney (2011 – 2019)
  (self-governing island)
 Seigneur – John Michael Beaumont, Seigneur of Sark (1974 – 2016)
  (crown dependency)
 Monarch – Elizabeth II, Duke of Normandy (1952–present)
 Lieutenant-Governor – Sir John McColl, Lieutenant-Governor of Jersey (2011–2016)
 Bailiff – Michael Birt, Bailiff of Jersey (2009–2015)
 Chief Minister – Ian Gorst, Chief Minister of Jersey (2011–2018)
  (crown dependency)
 Monarch – Elizabeth II, Lord of Mann (1952–present)
 Lieutenant-Governor – Adam Wood, Lieutenant-Governor of Man (2011–2016)
 Chief minister – Allan Bell, Chief Minister of the Isle of Man (2011–2016)
  (overseas territory)
 Governor – Adrian Davis, Governor of Montserrat (2011–2015)
 Premier–
Reuben Meade, Premier of Montserrat (2010-2014) (Chief Minister 2009-2010) 
Donaldson Romeo, Premier of Montserrat (2014–2019)
  (overseas territory)
 Governor –
 Victoria Treadell, Governor of the Pitcairn Islands (2010–2014)
 Jonathan Sinclair, Governor of the Pitcairn Islands (2014–2017)  
 Administrator – Alan Richmond, Administrator of the Pitcairn Islands (2014–2016) 
 Mayor –Shawn Christian, Mayor of the Pitcairn Islands (2014–2019)   
  Saint Helena and Dependencies (overseas territory)
 Governor – Mark Andrew Capes, Governor of Saint Helena (2011–2016)
  (Dependency of Saint Helena)
 Administrator – 
Colin Wells, Administrator of Ascension Island (2011–2014)
Marc Holland, Administrator of Ascension Island (2014–2018)   
  (Dependency of Saint Helena)
Administrator – Alex Mitham, Administrator of Tristan da Cunha (2013–2016)
  (overseas territory)
 Administrated by the Governor of the Falkland Islands
  (overseas territory)
 Governor – Peter Beckingham, Governor of the Turks and Caicos Islands (2013–2016)
 Premier – Rufus Ewing, Premier of the Turks and Caicos Islands (2012–2016)

United States
  (unincorporated territory)
 Governor – Lolo Matalasi Moliga, Governor of American Samoa (2013–2021)
  Baker Island (unincorporated territory)
 Administrated by US Department of the Interior
  (unincorporated territory)
 Governor – Eddie Calvo, Governor of Guam (2011–2019)
  Guantanamo Bay Naval Base (rented naval station)
 Commander – capt. John R. Nettleton, Commander of Guantanamo Bay Naval Station (2012–2015)
   Howland Island (unincorporated territory)
 Administered by US Department of the Interior
   Jarvis Island (unincorporated territory)
 Administered by US Department of the Interior
   Johnston Atoll (unincorporated territory)
 Administered by US Department of the Interior
   Kingman Reef (unincorporated territory)
 Administered by US Department of the Interior
   Midway Islands (unincorporated territory)
 Administered by US Department of the Interior
   Navassa Island (unincorporated territory)
 Administered by US Department of the Interior
  (commonwealth)
 Governor – Eloy Inos, Governor of the Northern Mariana Islands (2013–2015)
   Palmyra Atoll (incorporated territory)
 Administered by US Department of the Interior
  (commonwealth)
 Governor – Alejandro García Padilla, Governor of Puerto Rico (2013–2017)
  (unincorporated territory)
 Governor – John de Jongh, Governor of the US Virgin Islands (2007–2015)
  (unincorporated territory)
 Administered by US Department of the Interior

Others

  (territory with international status under the regulations of Antarctic Treaty, signed by 50 states, uninhabited territory)
 Executive Secretary – Manfred Reinke (Germany), Executive Secretary of Antarctic Treaty Secretariat (2009–2017)
 Marie Byrd Land Unclaimed territory in Antarctica 
 Paracel Islands Occupied by the People's Republic of China; claimed by Vietnam and the Republic of China (Taiwan)
 Spratly Islands' Claimed in their entirety by the People's Republic of China, the Republic of China (Taiwan), and Vietnam; portions claimed by Malaysia and the Philippines; about 45 islands are occupied by relatively small numbers of military forces from the People's Republic of China, Malaysia, the Philippines, the Republic of China (Taiwan), and Vietnam; Brunei has established a fishing zone that overlaps a southern reef, but has not made any formal claim''

See also
List of current dependent territory leaders

References

External links 
Rulersa list of rulers throughout time and places
WorldStatesmenan online encyclopedia of the leaders of nations and territories

Dependent territories
Lists of governors and heads of sub-national entities